Ayaş is a town and district of Ankara Province in the Central Anatolia region of Turkey, 58 km from the city of Ankara which is very rich for historical monuments. According to 2000 census, population of the district is 21,239 of which 7,839 live in the urban center of Ayaş.

The district is known for its mulberry trees, its tasty tomatoes and its healing mineral water spas, both for drinking and bathing. There is an annual mulberry festival in the town of Ayaş.

The town has a long history and is mentioned in folk songs and the journals of the traveller Evliya Çelebi.

History
The citizens of Ayaş were Oghuz tribes as the village names Bayat, Afşar and Peçenek implies. In 1554, it became a sanjak center, and in 1864 it became a Kaza in Ankara Vilayeti. In Ottoman period, education was advanced in Ayaş. In 1900, there were eight medreses, two primary mekteps and one rüşdiye.

Settlements in the district

Towns
 Ayaş
 Oltan

Villages

Picture gallery

See also
 Ayaş Tunnel, railway tunnel under construction, which will be Turkey's longest when completed.

Notes

References

External links

 District governor's official website 
 District municipality's official website 
 Map of Ayaş district 

 
Populated places in Ankara Province
Districts of Ankara Province